Carlos Antonio Mereles Cristaldo (born 9 July 1979 in Yaguarón, Paraguay) is a Paraguayan former professional footballer who played as a midfielder.

References

External links
 
 

1979 births
Living people
People from Paraguarí Department
Association football midfielders
Paraguayan footballers
Sport Colombia footballers
Club Tacuary footballers
Sportivo Luqueño players
Club Guaraní players
Sportivo Trinidense footballers
Club Atlético 3 de Febrero players
Fernando de la Mora footballers
General Caballero Sport Club footballers
Unión de Sunchales footballers
Independiente F.B.C. footballers
Club Atlético Adelante players